Zhong Honglian (born October 27, 1967) is a female Chinese football (soccer) player who competed in the 1996 Summer Olympics.

In 1996 she won the silver medal with the Chinese team. She was the backup goalkeeper behind Gao Hong.

External links

profile

1967 births
Living people
Chinese women's footballers
Olympic footballers of China
Footballers at the 1996 Summer Olympics
Olympic silver medalists for China
Olympic medalists in football
1991 FIFA Women's World Cup players
1995 FIFA Women's World Cup players
Women's association football goalkeepers
Asian Games medalists in football
Footballers at the 1990 Asian Games
Footballers at the 1994 Asian Games
Medalists at the 1996 Summer Olympics
China women's international footballers
Asian Games gold medalists for China
Medalists at the 1990 Asian Games
Medalists at the 1994 Asian Games